Alpine lake is a class of lakes found at high altitudes.

It may also refer to:

Lakes
Alpine Lake (Marin County, California), a reservoir in Marin County, California
Alpine Lake (Mono County, California), a natural lake in Mono County, California
Alpine Lake / Ata Puai, a lake in the West Coast Region of New Zealand
Alpine Lake (Central Sawtooth Wilderness), a glacial lake in Custer County, Idaho
Alpine Lake (Northern Sawtooth Wilderness), a glacial lake in Custer County, Idaho

Other uses
Alpine Lake, West Virginia, a gated community
Alpine Lakes Wilderness, a wilderness area in the Cascade Range of Washington (state)

See also
Lake Alpine, California, an unincorporated community in Alpine County, California
Lake Alpine, a lake in Alpine County, California